Democratic Labour was a minor political party operating in the United Kingdom in the 1970s. It was formed by the Labour MP Dick Taverne when his Constituency Labour Party (CLP) in the Lincoln constituency asked him to stand down as its candidate at the next general election. He had fallen out with it over Britain's proposed membership of the European Communities, which he supported but it did not.

Taverne resigned from Labour on 6 October 1972, forming the Lincoln Democratic Labour Association, which his supporters in the CLP joined. His initial intention was to eventually rejoin the Labour Party, but there were some who attempted to persuade him to try to establish a new party of the political centre.

Taverne resigned from parliament at the same time that he resigned from the Labour Party in order to force the issue into the open, and he won the ensuing Lincoln by-election, held in March 1973.

His victory was aided by the controversial adoption of Jonathan Guinness by the Conservatives, and by the lack of a Liberal candidate, for the Liberal Party decided to support Taverne's candidacy (in those days the party, financially weak, was only able to stand in a limited number of places, and had a very limited base to work from in Lincoln).

Shortly after his by-election victory, Taverne formed the Campaign for Social Democracy as a nationally based body. He was re-elected in the February 1974 general election, and continued to serve until the October 1974 general election when he was defeated, Harold Wilson having demanded the Labour Party "throw the kitchen sink" at Lincoln in its efforts to displace him. Taverne did not stand in the seat again, but Democratic Labour continued to organise politically, to the extent that Democratic Labour controlled Lincoln City Council from 1973 until 1979 and across England during the 1973 local elections Democratic Labour candidates achieved some success.

At the 1979 general election, Democratic Labour contested two constituencies: Lincoln, and Brigg and Scunthorpe. Taverne advised against nominating any candidates, but campaigned for them anyway. Both were unsuccessful in their attempts to gain seats in the House of Commons, losing their deposits (at that time 12.5% of the vote was required in order to retain deposits; this was reduced to 5% after the 1983 general election). However  both seats were narrowly gained from the incumbent Labour MPs by the Conservative Party's candidates, with the Conservative majority over Labour being less than the Democratic Labour vote. In an analysis of the voting in the election, Ivor Crewe, Director of the British Election Study, stated that the Democratic Labour candidates "splintered  enough of the Labour vote... to allow the Conservatives to gain both seats".

In 1980, Democratic Labour merged with the Social Democratic Alliance. A social club that the groups had established ran until 1987.

In many ways, Democratic Labour can be seen as a forerunner of the Social Democratic Party, which broke away from Labour in the early 1980s, putting forward many of the same viewpoints as Taverne. He twice stood as a Social Democratic Party candidate but failed to be elected.

Election results

References

Defunct social democratic parties in the United Kingdom
Defunct political parties in England
Political parties established in 1972
1972 establishments in the United Kingdom
Political parties disestablished in 1980
1980 disestablishments in the United Kingdom
Labour Party (UK) breakaway groups
Politics of Lincoln, England
Labour parties in the United Kingdom